Mike Hammer, Private Eye is an American syndicated television program based on the adventures of the fictitious private detective Mike Hammer, created by novelist Mickey Spillane. Like the previous series, it was produced by Jay Bernstein but in a less hands-on capacity. The show failed to gain a wide audience and, as a result, it was canceled after only one season. Mike Hammer, Private Eye premiered on September 27, 1997. The final episode of the series aired on June 14, 1998.

Premise
The series starred Stacy Keach and was seen as an attempt to revive the character he had played in Mickey Spillane's Mike Hammer and The New Mike Hammer, two moderately successful CBS series from the 1980s.  Kent Williams was the only other, regular actor from the 1980s series to return, albeit in a different role.  Guest star, Tracy Scoggins, formerly seen in a different role in the 1984 episode of Mickey Spillane's Mike Hammer, "24 Karat Dead," appears in episode 2, "Beat Street," of this series.

Cast
 Stacy Keach as Mike Hammer
 Shane Conrad as Nick Farrell
 Shannon Whirry as Velda
 Kent Williams as Deputy Mayor Barry Lawerence
 Peter Jason as Capt. Skip Gleason
 Malgosia Tomassi as Maya Ricci
 Rebekah Chaney as The Face

Episodes

References

External links 
 

1997 American television series debuts
1998 American television series endings
1990s American crime drama television series
First-run syndicated television programs in the United States
Television shows based on American novels
Television series by The Kushner-Locke Company
Mike Hammer (character) television series